Jack Tar (also Jacktar, Jack-tar or Tar) is a common English term originally used to refer to seamen of the Merchant or Royal Navy, particularly during the period of the British Empire.  By World War I the term was used as a nickname for those in the U.S. Navy.  Members of the public and seafarers alike made use of the name in identifying those who went to sea.  It was not used as a pejorative and sailors were happy to use the term to label themselves.

Etymology

There is some dispute among historians about the origin of "Jack", but it was a frequently used generic that identified the mass of common people. There are several plausible etymologies for the reference to "tar":
 In the age of wooden sailing vessels, a ship's rigging was rope made of hemp, which would rot quickly in such a damp environment. To avoid this, the ropes and cables of the standing rig were soaked in tar, which had to be replenished by tarring.
 Seamen were known to 'tar' their clothes before departing on voyages, in order to make them waterproof, before the invention of waterproof fabrics. Later they frequently wore coats and hats made from a waterproof fabric called tarpaulin. This may have been shortened to 'tar' at some point.
 In a widely accepted myth with no period evidence it said that Sailors smeared their hair with tar.  In a book published in 1915 the author surmised that it was common among seamen to plait their long hair into a ponytail and smear it with high grade tar to prevent it getting caught in the ship's equipment.

Usage

 Gilbert and Sullivan's 1878 operetta, H.M.S. Pinafore, subtitled The Lass That Loved a Sailor, uses the synonym 'tar' frequently in its dialogue, including the songs 'The Merry Maiden and the Tar' and 'A British Tar.'
 One of John Philip Sousa's lesser known works was his 'Jack Tar March,' written in 1903, which featured "The Sailor's Hornpipe" tune in one of its segments.
 Ship Ahoy! (All the Nice Girls Love a Sailor) 1908 is a music hall song with the line "all the nice girls love a tar"
 The second verse of George M. Cohan's song "You're a Grand Old Flag" contains the line "Hurrah! Hurrah! for every Yankee Tar."
 Jack Tars: Life in Nelson’s Navy, best-selling non-fiction book written by Roy and Lesley Adkins about the real lives of sailors in Nelson's age.
 The traditional English folk song "Go to Sea Once More" (alternately titled "Jack Tarr the Sailor") tells the tale of a sailor by the name of Jack Tarr who loses everything after an ill-advised drunken escapade while ashore in Liverpool.
 The traditional English folk song "Jacky Tar," sung by Eliza Carthy (previously collected and sung by A. L. Lloyd as "Do Me Ama"): Roud 511; Laws K40; Ballad Index LK40.
 John Adams called the crowd involved with the Boston Massacre "a motley rabble of saucy boys, negros and molattoes, Irish teagues and outlandish jack tarrs."
"Heart of Oak," the official march of the Royal Navy, features the line "Heart of oak are our ships, jolly tars are our men."
Rollins College of Winter Park, Florida, chose the "Tar" as its mascot.
People born in Swansea, UK are known as "Jacks" or "Swansea Jacks." One explanation for the name is that the people of Swansea had a reputation as skilled sailors and that their services were much sought after by the navy.
 In Anthony Shaffer's comedy/thriller play Sleuth, the most prominent of Andrew Wyke's automata is Jolly Jack Tarr, the Jovial Sailor. This life-sized figure laughs, and his body shakes appropriately, with the pressing of a remote control button. He is in several scenes, including one where a clue to a murder is hidden on Jolly Jack Tarr's person.
 The term forms the basis for the expression, "I'm alright, Jack," which signifies smug complacence at the expense of others.
 Period writers often referred to the simplicity of Jack Tar, and when he was represented as a drunk and a womanizer, the moral of the story was that he was easy prey for women, publicans and boarding house keepers.

References

External links
 
 

Nautical terminology